Francis Dominic Joseph Dallas (October 27, 1931 – July 22, 2007), also known as Frank "Sonny" Dallas, was an American jazz bassist and singer.

Born in Rankin, Pennsylvania, Dallas studied bass with Herman Clements, principal bassist of the Pittsburgh Symphony, who also taught jazz bassists Ray Brown and Paul Chambers, and by the mid 1950s, was working with bandleaders Charlie Spivak, Ray Eberle, and Claude Thornhill.

Moving to New York in 1955, he began performing and recording with the likes of Sal Salvador, Tony Scott, Chet Baker and Buck Clayton, Lee Konitz, Warne Marsh, Phil Woods, Gene Quill, Zoot Sims, Al Cohn, Elvin Jones, Mary Lou Williams, Bill Evans, George Wallington, Jackie Paris and Lennie Tristano, with whom he was most closely associated.

Moving to Long Island in the late 1960s, he obtained a Master of Arts degree in music education and began teaching at both Suffolk County Community College and Dowling College.

Down Beat listed Sonny Dallas as one of the top ten greatest jazz bassists.

Dallas died of heart failure in Long Island, New York. Survived by two daughters, Deborah Marko of North Braddock, Pennsylvania, and Elizabeth Dallas of New York; a son, Robert Dallas of Frederick, Maryland.

Discography

With Lee Konitz
You and Lee (Verve, 1959)
Motion (Verve, 1961)

With Phil Woods
Phil Talks with Quill

With Lennie Tristano
Descent into the Maelstrom 
Note to Note

References 

1931 births
2007 deaths
People from Rankin, Pennsylvania
Jazz musicians from Pennsylvania
American jazz double-bassists
Male double-bassists
20th-century American musicians
20th-century double-bassists
20th-century American male musicians
American male jazz musicians